The Fort Wayne Railroad Bridge, listed as the Pennsylvania Railroad Bridge on the National Register of Historic Places, is a double-deck steel truss railroad bridge spanning the Allegheny River in Pittsburgh, Pennsylvania.

The upper deck carries the Fort Wayne Line with two tracks of Norfolk Southern and Amtrak traffic. The lower deck is unused.

History
The bridge was built between 1901 and 1904 by American Bridge Company on new piers immediately next to the 1868 bridge it replaced while the old bridge remained in use.

The 1868 bridge was a five-span wrought-iron lattice truss built for the Pittsburgh, Fort Wayne and Chicago Railway with two simple plate girder spans as approach roads at each end.

In 1918 the bridge and associated approaches were raised (as were other neighboring bridges) to increase navigable headroom.

The lower level was used by local freight trains switching in the Downtown area and the Strip District. Its tracks were removed in the 1980s as part of a major track and platform realignment through Pennsylvania Station.

See also
List of crossings of the Allegheny River

References

External links

 

Bridges in Pittsburgh
Bridges over the Allegheny River
Bridges completed in 1904
Norfolk Southern Railway bridges
Pennsylvania Railroad bridges
Railroad bridges on the National Register of Historic Places in Pennsylvania
National Register of Historic Places in Pittsburgh
Steel bridges in the United States
Lattice truss bridges in the United States